Qeshlaq-e Babash-e Olya (also Romanized as Qeshlāq-e Bābāsh-e ‘Olyā) is a village in Qeshlaq-e Sharqi Rural District, Qeshlaq Dasht District, Bileh Savar County, Ardabil Province, Iran. At the 2006 census, its population was 108, in 23 families.

References 

Towns and villages in Bileh Savar County